In algebraic geometry, the Bott–Samelson resolution of a Schubert variety is a resolution of singularities.

Definition 
Let G be a connected reductive complex algebraic group, B a Borel subgroup and T a maximal torus contained in B.

Let  Any such w can be written as a product of reflections by simple roots. Fix minimal such an expression:

so that . (ℓ is the length of w.) Let  be the quotient:

It is a smooth projective variety. Writing  for the Schubert variety for w, the multiplication map

is a resolution of singularities called the Bott–Samelson resolution.  has the property:  and   In other words,  has rational singularities.

There are also some other constructions; see, for example, .

Notes

References 
.
.
.
.
.
.

Algebraic geometry
Singularity theory